En anglais is a studio album of the French popular singer Françoise Hardy. Original album released in United Kingdom in October 1968, on LP, Asparagus production/United Artists Records (ULP 1207), mono and (SULP 1207), stereo.
Published in France in December 1968, on LP, Production Asparagus/disques Vogue/Vogue international industries (CLD 729), stéréo universelle. Jean-Marie Périer was credited for the cover photography.

Track listing 
Françoise Hardy is accompanied by orchestras directed by Charles Blackwell (1-2-3-11), Arthur Greenslade (4-5-7-8-9), Simon Napier-Bell (6-12) and Jean-Pierre Sabar (10).

Editions

LP records: first editions in the English-speaking world 
 , 1968: Françoise - The Second English Album, World Records C° (ORC 6024).
 , 1968: Loving, Reprise Records (RS 6318).
 , 1969: Françoise Hardy in Anglais [sic], Production Asparagus/Phono Vox Records, coll. “Celebrity Series”, Vol. 2 (LPV 001).
 , 1969: Loving, Reprise Records (RS 6318).
 , 1969: Will You Love Me Tomorrow, Interfusion (SITFL 934.135).

Reissues 
 , 1990: CD (Jewel case), En anglais, Epic Records/Sony Records (ESCA 5191).
 , 2016: LP, En anglais, Parlophone/Warner Music (190295 989590).
 , 2016: CD (digipack), En anglais, Parlophone/Warner Music (190296 997488).

References 

Françoise Hardy albums
1968 albums
albums recorded at Olympic Sound Studios